The Discontented Canary is a 1934 Metro-Goldwyn-Mayer Happy Harmonies short directed by Rudolf Ising.

Plot 
The cartoon begins with a canary in his cage and a parrot singing. The canary wants to get out of his cage, but he is locked inside. Then, their owner arrives. But she accidentally leaves the cage open. Then, the canary flies out and goes outside. He descends into a garden, and a cat slyly sneaks up on him. The weather then gets windy as a thunderstorm arrives in. Then, the cat chases the canary around the garden. Suddenly, a lightning bolt strikes the cat's tail and he runs away screaming in agony. Realizing the outside world isn't as safe as his cage, the canary flies back home and sings as the cartoon ends.

Notes 
 It is the oldest MGM cartoon to be owned by Warner Bros.
 First Happy Harmonies short film, although at the opening it is credited as A METRO COLOR CARTOON.

Availability 
 Various public domain VHS/DVD. (These copies are missing the entire scene with the canary interacting with other wildlife. The censored print jumps from the cat lurking towards the bird to the start of the thunderstorm.)
 DVD - Myrna Loy and William Powell Collection - Disc 2 (Evelyn Prentice) DVD (1995 Turner "dubbed" version, DVNR; this version is uncut with the canary interacting with the other wildlife intact)
 DVD - Happy Harmonies - Disc 1 DVD

References

External links 
 

1934 films
1934 animated films
1930s animated short films
Metro-Goldwyn-Mayer animated short films
Metro-Goldwyn-Mayer short films
Films directed by Rudolf Ising
Animated films about birds
Animated films about cats
Happy Harmonies
1930s American films